Wolfe Islander III is the ferry currently serving between Kingston, Ontario and Wolfe Island. She can hold approximately 55 cars, and is end-loading. The length of the car deck is 61 metres (200 feet).  The vehicle height restriction is 4.4 m (14 feet, 5 inches). As it is the only public access to Wolfe Island, the vessel operates as a free ferry. Crossing time is approximately 20 minutes. She was launched into service on 5 February 1976 by then Ontario Minister of Transportation, James W. Snow.

The previous ferry in service was Wolfe Islander II.

The ferry terminal on Wolfe Island varied by season until the fall of 2020. During the three-year reconstruction of the Barrack Street Dock in Kingston and the Marysville dock on Wolfe Island, the Dawson's Point dock will be used year-round on the Wolfe Island side. The route used to include a bubbler system that stretched to the Barrack Street Dock in Kingston, Ontario. It became non-operational for several years, and the machinery was removed in the fall of 2020 during Barrack Street dock reconstruction at Kingston.

The Kingston Terminal is located at the foot of Barrack Street, at Ontario Street.

In 2017, the Ontario provincial government ordered a new battery electric powered  ferry with a capacity of 399 people and 75 vehicles from Damen Group to operate the Wolfe Island route. That new ferry, the MV Wolfe Islander IV was to have begun operations in April 2022 as the new vessel is compatible with both the existing and new dock and ramp infrastructure.

References

External links
 Wolfe Island Ferry Service schedule

Ferries of Ontario
No-fee ferries
Transport in Frontenac County
1975 ships